The 2023 Liga de Balompié Mexicano season is the 4th professional season of the most important league of competitions organized by the Asociación Nacional del Balompié Mexicano, a Mexican football federation affiliated with CONIFA. The season began on 10 February 2023 and will finish on 28 May 2023.

Offseason changes 
 10 teams will participate in the league.
 Cóndor FC, EFIX Soccer Club and RED entered the league as expansion teams.
 Halcones de Querétaro withdrew from the LBM due to financial problems, but the reserve team remained in the Segunda División del Balompié Mexicano.
 Toros México was promoted from the Segunda División del Balompié Mexicano.
 The format of the league changed, now the ten participating teams were divided into two groups taking the geographical location as division criteria. The two group winners qualify directly for the semifinals, while the second and third place advance to the reclassification stage.

Teams 
{{Location map+ |Mexico |width=500|float=right |caption=Liga de Balompié Mexicano 2023 Official Teams |places=

Regular season

Group 1

Standings

Positions by round

Results

Group 2

Standings

Positions by round

Results

Regular Season statistics

Top goalscorers
Players sorted first by goals scored, then by last name.

Source:[]

Hat-tricks

(H) – Home ; (A) – Away

League table

See also 
Liga de Balompié Mexicano

References

External links 
 Official website of LBM 

Liga de Balompié Mexicano
1